The Haita is a left tributary of the river Neagra in Romania. It discharges into the Neagra in Gura Haitii.

References

Rivers of Romania
Rivers of Suceava County